Dmitriy Panarin (born 8 January 2000) is a Kazakhstani badminton player from Kostanay. He competed in the 2018 Summer Youth Olympics mixed team event.

Career 
Panarin won his first international title at the Kazakhstan International in 2018. In 2021, he won his second title at the Cyprus International after beating Tarun Reddy Katam. Outside of singles, he also plays men's doubles with Artur Niyazov and they also won the Kazakhstan International men's doubles title.

Panarin also plays mixed doubles with Kamila Smagulova. They finished up as runners-up at the 2021 Lithuanian International and later won the Botswana International.

Achievements

BWF International Challenge/Series (7 titles, 5 runners-up) 
Men's singles

Men's doubles

Mixed doubles

  BWF International Challenge tournament
  BWF International Series tournament
  BWF Future Series tournament

BWF Junior International (9 titles, 4 runners-up) 
Boys' singles

Men's doubles

Mixed doubles

  BWF Junior International Grand Prix tournament
  BWF Junior International Challenge tournament
  BWF Junior International Series tournament
  BWF Junior Future Series tournament

References 

2000 births
Living people
People from Kostanay
Kazakhstani male badminton players